The Museum of Contemporary Art, Los Angeles (MOCA) is a contemporary art museum with two locations in greater Los Angeles, California. The main branch is located on Grand Avenue in Downtown Los Angeles, near the Walt Disney Concert Hall. MOCA's original space, initially intended as a "temporary" exhibit space while the main facility was built, is now known as the Geffen Contemporary, in the Little Tokyo district of downtown Los Angeles. Between 2000 and 2019, it operated a satellite facility at the Pacific Design Center facility in West Hollywood.

The museum's exhibits consist primarily of American and European contemporary art created after 1940. Since the museum's inception, MOCA's programming has been defined by its multi-disciplinary approach to contemporary art.

Founding 
In a 1979 political fund raising event at the Beverly Hills Hotel, Los Angeles Mayor Tom Bradley, Councilman Joel Wachs, and local philanthropist Marcia Simon Weisman happened to be seated at the same table. Throughout the evening, Weisman passionately discussed the city's need for a contemporary art museum. Weisman's brother, Norton Simon, had stepped in to bail out the financially ailing Pasadena Art Museum in 1975, but was unable to retain its focus on modern art. In the following weeks, the Mayor's Museum Advisory Committee was organized. The committee, led by William A. Norris, set about creating a museum from scratch, including locating funds, trustees, directors, curators, a gallery, and most importantly an art collection. That same year, Weisman and five other key local collectors signed an agreement whereby they would pledge chunks of their private collections, worth up to $6 million, "to create a museum of standing and repute."

The following year, the fledgling Museum of Contemporary Art was operating out of an office on Boyd Street. The city's most prominent philanthropists and collectors had been assembled into a Board of Trustees in 1980, and set a goal of raising $10 million in their first year; an artists advisory council was involved early on. A working staff was brought together; Richard Koshalek was appointed chief curator; relationships were made with artists and galleries; and negotiations were begun to secure artwork and an exhibition space. Following Weisman's initiative, $1-million contributions from Eli Broad, Max Palevsky, and Atlantic Richfield Co. helped securing the construction of the new museum; Broad became MOCA's founding chairman; Palevsky chaired the architectural search committee.  Many of MOCA's initial donors were young and supporting the arts for the first time; a substantial number joined up at the $10,000 "founder" minimum.

Collection 
Making up well over 90% of the museum's works, gifts from several major private collectors form the cornerstones of MOCA's permanent collection of nearly 6,000 works. Much of it has come from board members who donated or bequeathed key works or entire collections, or sold art to the museum at highly favorable terms.

Within months of its fall 1983 opening, MOCA was able to turn itself into an instant player in the international art world by striking a deal with one of its board members, Giuseppe Panza, who agreed to sell a group of works for $11 million and stagger the payments over five years, interest-free. The 1984 purchase of parts of the Panza Collection encompasses 80 seminal works of abstract expressionism and pop art by Jean Fautrier, Franz Kline, Roy Lichtenstein, Claes Oldenburg, Robert Rauschenberg, Mark Rothko, and Antoni Tàpies. In 1985, the museum accepted Michael Heizer's earthwork Double Negative in Nevada desert, donated by Virginia Dwan. A 1986 bequest by television executive Barry Lowen included 67 works of minimalist, post-minimalist and neo-expressionist painting, sculpture, photography and drawing by artists such as Dan Flavin, Ellsworth Kelly, Agnes Martin, Elizabeth Murray, Julian Schnabel, Joel Shapiro, Frank Stella, and Cy Twombly. In 1989, pieces by the Rita and Taft Schreiber collection were donated to the museum, encompassing 18 paintings, sculptures, and drawings by Jackson Pollock, Piet Mondrian, and Arshile Gorky, among others. Hollywood agent Phil Gersh and his wife Beatrice, both founding members, gave 13 important pieces from their collection to the museum the same year, including Pollock's early drip painting Number 3, 1948 and David Smith's 8-foot-tall stainless steel sculpture Cubi III (1961) — as well as works by artists such as Ed Ruscha, Cindy Sherman, and Susan Rothenberg. Finally, the museum's co-founder Marcia Simon Weisman bequeathed 83 works on paper from artists including Willem de Kooning, Barnett Newman, Jasper Johns and California-based painters Richard Diebenkorn and Sam Francis. In 1991, Hollywood screenwriter Scott Spiegel donated works by Jean-Michel Basquiat, Mark Innerst, Robert Longo, Susan Rothenberg, David Salle, among others. In 2003, the museum received the promise of a gift of 33 pieces from advertising executive Clifford Einstein, chair of MOCA's board of trustees, and his wife, Madeline; the proposed donation included works by Kiki Smith, Nam June Paik, Mark Grotjahn, Sigmar Polke, Mike Kelley, and Lari Pittman. In 2004 the museum received the largest group of artworks donated by a private collector in its 25-year history when E. Blake Byrne, a MOCA trustee and retired television executive, gave 123 paintings, sculptures, drawings, videos and photographs by 78 artists. Over the years, major donations of art collections have come from the Lannan Foundation and through funding from the Ralph M. Parsons Foundation.

In 2000, MOCA received gifts from artists themselves, including major pieces by sculptor and performance artist Paul McCarthy, video artist Doug Aitken and photographer Andreas Gursky. Los Angeles-based artist Ed Moses made a major gift of his work to the museum in 1995, surveying nearly 40 years of his artistic development.

Included within today's permanent collection are works by further influential artists such as Greg Colson, Kim Dingle, Sam Durant, David Hockney, Kenneth Price, John McLaughlin, Robert Motherwell, Raymond Pettibon, James Hayward, and George Segal. As the Los Angeles Times declared, "There isn't a city in America—not New York, not Chicago, not Houston, not San Francisco—where a more impressive museum collection of contemporary art can be seen."

Exhibitions 
Ever since it opened with an extensive exhibition called The First Show: Painting and Sculpture From Eight Collections, 1940-80, MOCA has been known for thematic-survey exhibitions about postwar art such as A Forest of Signs: Art in the Crisis of Representation (1989), A Minimal Future? Art as Object, 1958-1968 (1994), Reconsidering the Object of Art: 1965-1975 (1995), Hall of Mirrors: Art and Film since 1945 (1996), Out of Actions: Between Performance and the Object, 1949-1979 (1998), WACK! Art and the Feminist Revolution (2007), Art in the Streets (2011), Under the Big Black Sun: California Art 1974–1981 (2011), and Ends of the Earth: Land Art to 1974 (2012). The museum also organized the first major museum retrospectives of the work of Allen Ruppersberg (1985), John Baldessari (1990), Ad Reinhardt (1991), Jeff Wall (1997), Barbara Kruger (1999), and Takashi Murakami (2007). In addition there were also monographic shows like an ambitious installation by Robert Gober in 1997, or a revelatory survey of Sigmar Polke's photographic work in 1995. Since many of those shows traveled to New York and other cities in the U.S., like the show of Robert Rauschenberg combines that opened in Los Angeles in 2006, MOCA became known as "one of the greatest feeder museums in the country". In 2010, the museum canceled a planned retrospective of influential yet under-recognized artist Jack Goldstein to commission artist and director Julian Schnabel to curate a survey of works by actor, writer and artist Dennis Hopper, and in 2012, actor James Franco curated a tribute exhibition to James Dean, two projects that have been widely criticized for their emphasis on pop and celebrity culture. Of all solo shows on view over the period between January 2008 and December 2012, only about 28% were devoted to female artists.

Besides artists' retrospectives and art historical investigations, under chief curator Paul Schimmel, MOCA has mounted various multiartist theme shows on provocative or challenging topics. Helter Skelter: L.A. Art in the 1990s, a 1992 exhibition focused on the dark side of contemporary life as portrayed by artists like Mike Kelley, Paul McCarthy and Chris Burden, involving themes such as alienation, dispossession, and violence. Out of Actions: Between Performance and the Object, 1949-1979, a landmark historical survey presented in 1998, tracked the work of about 150 artists and collectives for whom public performances, in its links to painting, sculpture, dance and theater, and the creative process were far more important than well-crafted objects. Public Offerings, in 2001, explored the phenomenon of youthful creative energy in an overheated art world where stars are created before they leave art school. In ECSTASY: In and About Altered States (2005), some of the artists' works represented altered states of mind that they have experienced under the influence of drugs or hypnosis. WACK! Art and the Feminist Revolution, held in 2007, was the first major retrospective of art and the feminist revolution. MOCA hosts the LA Freewaves biennial festival, which exhibits a wide range of new media.

Locations

MOCA Grand Avenue 

The MOCA Downtown Los Angeles location is home to almost 5,000 artworks created since 1940, including masterpieces by classic contemporary artists, and inspiring new works by emerging and mid-career artists from Southern California and around the world. The MOCA is the only museum in Los Angeles devoted exclusively to contemporary art.

In 1986, the celebrated Japanese architect Arata Isozaki, who had never worked on a project in the United States before, completed the downtown location's sandstone building to international critical and public acclaim, marking a dramatic achievement in the contemporary art world and heralding a new cultural era in Los Angeles. Its chief exhibition spaces are under the courtyard level, lit from above by groups of pyramidal skylights.

On the grounds that the law said that 1.5% of the construction costs of new buildings had to be spent on fine-arts embellishments, MOCA's board of trustees had struck a deal with the Community Redevelopment Agency to have the project developer build a 100,000-square-foot museum, designed by an architect of the trustees' choice, at no cost to the museum. In return for the free building, the agency required the trustees to raise $10 million for an operations endowment. Original plans had been for the building to open in time for the 1984 Summer Olympics. However, the project broke ground in 1983 and completed the museum, Omni Hotel and the first of two skyscrapers (One California Plaza) by 1986. The second skyscraper (Two California Plaza) was completed in 1992. Nancy Rubins'  monumental stainless-steel sculpture "Mark Thompson's Airplane Parts" (2001), purchased by MOCA in honor of founding member Beatrice Gersh in 2002, was installed at the museum's plaza.

The Grand Avenue location is used to display pieces from MOCA's substantial permanent collection, especially artists who did much of their work between 1940 and 1980. There is also an extensive set of rooms used to display temporary exhibits, usually a major retrospective of an important artist, or works connected by a theme.

The Geffen Contemporary at MOCA
While the Grand Avenue facility was being planned and under construction, MOCA opened an interim exhibition space called the "Temporary Contemporary" in the fall of 1983. The new space was located at the edge of a warehouse district in which many Los Angeles artists worked at the time. On November 17, 1983, the museum inaugurated the building with a Shinto purification ceremony, a ritual often held at groundbreakings in Little Tokyo, as a symbol of mutual recognition between the Japanese community and the museum. The first public program was a commissioned collaboration, "Available Light" by Lucinda Childs, Frank O. Gehry, and John Adams followed in November 1983 by the inaugural exhibition, "The First Show: Painting and Sculpture from 1940–1980" curated by Julia Brown. The building had been originally constructed in the 1940s as a hardware store for local patrons and subsequently used as a city warehouse and police car garage, the "TC", as it became informally known, is leased from the city for five years for $1 a year.

Southern California architect Frank Gehry led the renovation of the Albert C. Martin, Sr.-designed 1947 Union Hardware buildings. Gehry left the exteriors intact, except for new entrance doors, and built a canopy of chain-link fencing and steel trusses over the closed-off street, to form a partially shaded plaza. There are two large, open gallery spaces, illuminated by industrial wire-glass skylights and a row of clerestory windows along the south wall. The intricate structural network of steel beams and supports has been left exposed, serving as support for the many movable display walls and lending a sculptural effect. A steel crane rail, left over from the building's hardware days, remained in place. The loading docks now serve as the lobby.

The Temporary Contemporary immediately captivated critics and museum patrons alike with its accessibility, informality and lack of pretension. Writing in The New York Times, John Russell referred to it as "a prince among spaces", and William Wilson of the Los Angeles Times wrote that it "instantly had the hospitable aura of a people's museum." In the view of many, these two appraisals have been borne out in the ensuing years. The New York Times later wrote that "[m]ore than any event in recent decades, the Temporary (now known as the Geffen Contemporary) changed the cultural face of Los Angeles".

Due to the popularity of the Temporary Contemporary and extraordinary suitability of the building for exhibiting contemporary art, the museum's board requested that the City of Los Angeles extend MOCA's lease on the facility for 50 years, until 2038. That request was granted in early 1986, and in 1996 the city extended the lease even further. Also in 1996, MOCA received a $5-million gift from The David Geffen Foundation in support of the museum's endowment drive, and in recognition of this extraordinary gift, the Temporary Contemporary was renamed The Geffen Contemporary at MOCA.

In 2019, MOCA received another $5-million gift from Wonmi and Kihong Kwon to transform the Geffen Contemporary with a cross-disciplinary series that will emphasize varied forms of performance but will also include experiential installations, concerts, screenings, readings, conventions and other events. It also will host artist residencies and rehearsals.

The 55,000-square-foot facility gives enormous latitude to artists and encourages experimentation. It is the largest of the MOCA locations and is ideally suited to large-scale sculptural works and conceptual, multi-media or electronic installations. It is typically used to display more recent works, often by lesser-known artists, and works which require a large amount of space. Some of these works are designed specifically for the Geffen Contemporary's space. In 2018, MOCA unveiled a Barbara Kruger mural, Untitled (Questions), on the Geffen exterior facing Temple Street and sponsored by Wonmi and Kihong Kwon.

In 2021, MOCA received one of the inaugural grants from the Frankenthaler Climate Initiative to support its solar energy project at the Geffen Contemporary.

MOCA at The Pacific Design Center 

From 2000 until 2019, MOCA maintained a  exhibition space at the Pacific Design Center in West Hollywood to present new work by emerging and established artists as well as ancillary programs based upon its major exhibitions and renowned permanent collection. A focus was on design and architecture. The museum exhibited work by Takashi Murakami, Sterling Ruby, Catherine Opie and William Kentridge there, as well as by designers Rick Owens and Rodarte. MOCA also utilized the 384-seat PDC auditorium for a range of public programs.

Programs

Sunday Studio 
On the first Sunday of each month from 1pm to 3:30pm, Sunday Studio workshops typically begin with an interactive, discussion-based "spotlight" tour, highlighting selected works from a current exhibition. Next, participants work collaboratively to create art in response to the work they've seen.

Designed and taught by artists, these  process-oriented workshops extend the gallery experience and frequently include special activities such as musical performance, movement, and other multidisciplinary approaches to works on view. The program is offered in English and Spanish.

Big Family Day is an annual spring culminating event for all of MOCA's school and community partnership programs. Featuring student docents, entertainment, music, artmaking and a student art exhibition, this event usually attracts over 1,000 participants, including MOCA members, their families, and the community at large.

Sunday Studio events are held at Grand Avenue unless otherwise stated in the bimonthly calendar or on the website.

Teens of Contemporary Art (TOCA) 

Teens of Contemporary Art is an open gathering of high school students interested in learning more about contemporary art with their peers. The group meets each month for exhibition explorations, art workshops, discussions about contemporary art, and events planning. An advisory council of teens identifies the topics and issues addressed at the monthly sessions. All TOCA participants get free admission to the museum.

TOCA events are the second Sunday of every month.

MOCA Apprenticeship Program (MAP) 

Each year the MOCA Apprenticeship Program (MAP) creates a supportive artistic community for a small, diverse group of high school students. During this nine-month internship program, apprentices meet weekly with MOCA staff and guest artists, undertake individual and self-directed projects throughout the museum and discover more about contemporary art, MOCA, and their own professional future. Apprentices are considered staff and are paid an hourly wage. MAP participation is available by application only. Applications are available and due in the spring of each year.

Engagement Party 
Engagement Party (2008-2012) was a free public program that presented new work by emerging Southern California–based artists working collectively and collaboratively. The program offered artist collectives three-month residencies during which they presented public programs at MOCA Grand Avenue and the Geffen Contemporary at MOCA on the first Thursday of each month from 7 to 10pm. Collectives employed many different mediums, disciplines, and strategies during their residency, resulting in programs that included performances, workshops, screenings, lectures, and many other activities emerging from the group's particular focus.

Participating Artists: Finishing School, Knifeandfork (Brian House and Sue Huang), OJO, Slanguage, My Barbarian, Lucky Dragons, Ryan Heffington + the East Siders, and The League of Imaginary Scientists,  Neighborhood Public Radio, The Los Angeles Urban Rangers, Liz Glynn, and CamLab.

Women in the Arts 
The Women in the Arts event, established in 1994 by the MOCA fundraising arm the MOCA Projects Council, is a benefit for MOCA's educational programs and generally draws more than 600 people from the fields of art, fashion, philanthropy, film and other areas of entertainment. The Award to Distinguished Women in the Arts recognizes women providing leadership and innovation in visual arts, dance, music and literature. Artist Jenny Holzer is one of the main females that has shown her work through textile and expressing her believes in the feminist art movement. Holzer art has changed over the years from making street posters, painted signs, paintings, photographs, to creating T-shirts for Willi Smith, and establishing a trend of LED signs. Holzers has been involved in many events and foundations such as, Dia Art Foundation,  Time's Up movement, Social Strategies , Institute of Contemporary Arts, and many more.  Holzer designed the bronze plaque, which features one
of the artist's truisms: “It is in your self-interest to find a way to be very tender.” Past recipients include collector Beatrice Gersh (1994), editor Tina Brown (1997), choreographer Twyla Tharp (1999), actress and director Anjelica Huston (2001), and artists Barbara Kruger (2001), Yoko Ono (2003), Jenny Holzer (2010), Annie Leibovitz (2012) and Marylin Minter (2015).

Management

Director
In November 2021, Johanna Burton joined MOCA as the executive director, with Klaus Biesenbach shifting to the role of artistic director. Burton is formerly the director of the Wexner Center for the Arts in Columbus, Ohio. Prior to Johanna's arrival, Klaus Bisenbach departed MOCA to serve as director of the Neue Nationalgalerie in Berlin, Germany.

In July 2018, MoMA PS1 curator Klaus Biesenbach, was named as the new director of MOCA, following the abrupt resignation of Philippe Vergne. Vergne, formerly the director of the Dia Art Foundation in New York, began his tenure as MOCA's director in January 2014, and ended it amid a series of controversies, including the firing of chief curator Helen Molesworth.

Before Vergne, Maria Seferian served as interim director from September 2013 to March 2014, while the institution underwent the search for its next director. She has been counsel to the museum since 2008. The New York art dealer and curator Jeffrey Deitch served as director of MOCA from June 1, 2010 through September 1, 2013. On July 24, 2013 he told the board of his decision to leave. Deitch experienced a measure of controversy for his clash with Paul Schimmel, the museum's then-chief curator. The board's firing of Schimmel on June 28, 2012 was met with criticism from the community.

Between 1999 and 2008, Jeremy Strick led the institution. Before that, Richard Koshalek served as director, deputy director and chief curator from 1980 to 1999. Pontus Hultén was founding director between 1980 and 1982.

Board of Trustees
As of August 2016, MOCA's board is headed by Guess jeans co-founder Maurice Marciano and Lilly Tartikoff Karatz. Vice chairs are Eugenio Lopez, Lillian P. Lovelace and Maria Seferian; chair emeriti are Clifford J. Einstein and David G. Johnson; president emeriti are Dallas Price-Van Breda and Jeffrey Soros. Board members are Wallis Annenberg, Gabriel Brener, Steven A. Cohen, Charles L. Conlan II, Kathi B. Cypres, Laurent Degryse, Ariel Emanuel, Susan Gersh, Aileen Getty, Nancy Jane F. Goldston, Laurence Graff, Bruce Karatz, Wonmi Kwon, Daniel S. Loeb, Mary Klaus Martin, Jamie McCourt, Edward J. Minskoff, Steven T. Mnuchin, Peter Morton, Heather Podesta, Carolyn Clark Powers, Steven F. Roth, Carla Sands, Chara Schreyer, Adam Sender, Sutton Stracke, Cathy Vedovi, Christopher Walker, Orna Amir Wolens. Artists sitting on MOCA's board include John Baldessari, Barbara Kruger, Catherine Opie, Mark Grotjahn, Mark Bradford and Lari Pittman. Life trustees include MOCA's founding chairman Eli Broad as well as Betye Monell Burton, Blake Byrne, Lenore S. Greenberg, Audrey Irmas, Frederick M. Nicholas and Thomas E. Unterman. The current Los Angeles mayor (Eric Garcetti) and LA City Council president (Herb J. Wesson Jr.), chief financial officer (Michael Harrison) and museum director (Philippe Vergne) are ex-officio members.

The current mayor and president of the city council have votes; their presence on the board is a condition for MOCA's long-term $1 a year lease on the Geffen Contemporary building. In accordance with a policy enacted in 1993, trustees serve three-year, renewable terms and rotate off after six years; they are generally invited to return after one year.

Despite this addition of wealthy art collectors to the board, contributions and grants to the museum have fallen recently, and Broad missed two quarters of payments of the money he promised MOCA. All of the artist members of the board—John Baldessari, Barbara Kruger, Catherine Opie and Ed Ruscha—resigned later that year, in response to developments at the museum under the leadership of Jeffrey Deitch, including the termination of senior curator Paul Schimmel.

In 2014, Baldessari, Kruger and Opie resumed their positions on the MOCA board. Also, fellow artists Mark Grotjahn and Mark Bradford were elected to MOCA's board over the course of 2014; Lari Pittman was added in August 2016.

Funding
Unlike the Los Angeles County Museum of Art, which is partly controlled by the county, MOCA receives minimal government funding and does not have a steady source of funds. Its annual budget has grown to exceed $20 million, but it relies on donors to pay about 80% of its expenses. MOCA's budget for the fiscal year 2011 was $14.3 million, the museum's lowest spending since the 1990s. In 2011, the museum reported net assets (basically, a total of all the resources it has on its books, except the value of the art) of $38 million.

In December 2008, during the world financial meltdown, newspapers reported that the museum's endowment, which partly depended on stock investments, had dropped and that museum had fiscal problems  Partly in violation of state law, the museum lost $44 million of their $50 million endowment over nine years, Deficits mounted at the rate of $2.8 million a year on average from mid-2000 to mid-2008. Amid speculation that the museum may close its doors, deaccession artworks, and/or merge with another institution, a grassroots, artist-led organization called MOCA Mobilization petitioned for MOCA to remain independent and keep its collection intact.

The Attorney General's office, to whom Eli Broad had been a campaign contributor, investigated MOCA. Ultimately, although the investigation was closed with no disciplinary action (Board members were asked to take a voluntary training in their fiduciary duties), just the report of the investigation in the Los Angeles Times had an enormous impact – donors fled and the trustees, in the maelstrom, accepted Broad's terms for control of the institution in exchange for his promise to donate money. Broad, MOCA's founding chairman from 1979 to 1984 and life trustee of the museum, offered $30 million in a staggered donation, $15 million as matching donations. An agreement with Broad was tentatively reached on December 18, but another possibility—a merger with the Los Angeles County Museum of Art—had not been ruled out. On December 23, the museum announced that it had accepted Broad's offer and would be making a number of significant changes to its leadership. Director Jeremy Strick resigned, and a new position of chief executive officer was created for Charles E. Young, former chancellor of the University of California, Los Angeles. Broad required compliance with strict financial terms, but did not demand Strick's resignation or Young's appointment as a condition. Hired for a limited term, Young oversaw layoffs and cutbacks in the exhibition schedule that reduced MOCA's budget from more than $24 million to less than the $16 million in 2011. In a departure from past practice, when MOCA would schedule shows before funding had been secured, it has adopted a policy of committing to exhibitions only after at least 80% of its projected budget has been lined up.

The departure of respected curator Paul Schimmel on June 28, 2012 led to an exodus of trustees, committee members and a bombardment of criticism in the community. And because Broad himself has defaulted on his promised payments to MOCA that expire in 2013 the viability of the institution has come into question under Broad's leadership. As of late 2012, the Museum of Contemporary Art and the private University of Southern California are in talks about a possible partnership.

In a first for MOCA, a two-day Sotheby's auction of donated works by artists in May 2015 raised $22.5 million for the museum endowment; the sale included works by Mark Grotjahn, Takashi Murakami and Ed Ruscha.

Attendance
MOCA exhibitions draw roughly 60% of their visitors from the L.A. area; their attendance totaled 236,104 in 2010, up by 89,000 over the previous year.

See also
Effects of the financial crisis of 2007–2009 on museums
 Joel Wachs, Los Angeles City Council member honored with Joel Wachs Square near the museum

References

External links 

 
MOCA Geffen Official Website
Image of worker polishing the main entrance sign to MOCA, Los Angeles, 1986. Los Angeles Times Photographic Archive (Collection 1429). UCLA Library Special Collections, Charles E. Young Research Library, University of California, Los Angeles.

Art museums and galleries in Los Angeles
Contemporary art galleries in the United States
Modern art museums in the United States
Buildings and structures in Downtown Los Angeles
Museum of Contemporary Art, Los Angeles
Art museums established in 1983
Bunker Hill, Los Angeles
Downtown Los Angeles
Little Tokyo, Los Angeles
Arata Isozaki buildings
Postmodern architecture in California